This is a list of current monarchies. There are 13 in Asia, 12 in Europe, 9 in the Americas, 6 in Oceania, and 3 in Africa.

Types of monarchy
These are the approximate categories which present monarchies fall into:

 Commonwealth realms. King Charles III is the monarch of fifteen Commonwealth realms (Antigua and Barbuda, Australia, The Bahamas, Belize, Canada, Grenada, Jamaica, New Zealand, Papua New Guinea, Saint Kitts and Nevis, Saint Lucia, Saint Vincent and the Grenadines, Solomon Islands, Tuvalu, and the United Kingdom). They evolved out of the British Empire into fully independent states within the Commonwealth of Nations that retain the same King as head of state, unlike other Commonwealth countries that are either dependencies, republics or have a different royal house. All fifteen realms are constitutional monarchies and full democracies, where the King (or his representative) legally possesses vast prerogatives, but fulfills a largely ceremonial role.
 Other European constitutional monarchies. Andorra, Belgium, Denmark, Luxembourg, the Kingdom of the Netherlands, Norway, Spain, and Sweden are fully democratic states in which the monarch has a limited, largely, or entirely ceremonial role.
Andorra is unique among all existing monarchies, as it is a diarchy, with the Co-Princeship being shared by the President of France and the Bishop of Urgell. This arrangement creates a unique situation among monarchies, as 
 neither Co-Prince is of Andorran descent,
 one is elected by common citizens of a foreign country (France), but not by Andorrans as they cannot vote in the French Presidential Elections,
 the other, the bishop of Urgell, is appointed by a foreign head of state, the Pope.
 European mixed monarchies. Liechtenstein and Monaco are constitutional monarchies in which the Prince retains many powers of an absolute monarch. For example, the 2003 Constitution referendum gives the Prince of Liechtenstein the power to veto any law that the Landtag (parliament) proposes and vice versa. The Prince can hire or dismiss any elective member or government employee from their post. However, unlike an absolute monarch, the people can call for a referendum to end the Prince's reign. The Prince of Monaco has similar powers: he cannot hire or dismiss any elective member or government employee from their post, but he can select the minister of state, government council and judges.
Muslim monarchies. Absolute monarchs remain in Brunei, Oman, Jordan, Saudi Arabia, Bahrain, Kuwait, Qatar, and the United Arab Emirates are classified as mixed, meaning there are representative bodies of some kind, but the monarch retains most of his powers. Malaysia and Morocco are constitutional monarchies, but their monarchs still retain more substantial powers than in European equivalents.

 East and Southeast Asian constitutional monarchies. Bhutan, Cambodia, Japan, and Thailand have constitutional monarchies where the monarch has a limited or ceremonial role. Thailand changed from traditional absolute monarchy into a constitutional one in 1932, while Bhutan changed in 2008. Cambodia had its own monarchy after independence from the French Colonial Empire, which was deposed after the Khmer Rouge came into power. The monarchy was subsequently restored in the peace agreement of 1993. 
 Other sovereign monarchies. Five monarchies do not fit into one of the above groups by virtue of geography or class of monarchy: Tonga in Polynesia; Eswatini and Lesotho in Southern Africa; and the Sovereign Military Order of Malta (SMOM), and Vatican City in Europe. Of these, Lesotho and Tonga are constitutional monarchies, while Eswatini and Vatican City are absolute monarchies.
 Eswatini is increasingly being considered a diarchy. The King, or Ngwenyama, rules alongside his mother, the Ndlovukati, as dual heads of state originally designed to be checks on political power. The Ngwenyama, however, is considered the administrative head of state, while the Ndlovukati is considered the spiritual and national head of state, a position which has become largely symbolic in recent years.
 SMOM is governed by an elected Prince and Grand Master.
 The Pope is the absolute monarch of Vatican City by virtue of his position as head of the Roman Catholic Church and Bishop of Rome; he is an elected rather than hereditary ruler. The Pope need not be a citizen of the territory prior to his election by the cardinals.
 Non-sovereign monarchies. A non-sovereign monarchy or subnational monarchy is one in which the head of the monarchical polity (whether a geographic territory or an ethnic group), and the polity itself, are subject to a sovereign state.  The non-sovereign monarchies of Malaysia, emirates of the United Arab Emirates and kingdoms of Uganda are examples of these.

Lines of succession

Some of the extant sovereign monarchies have lines of succession that go back to the medieval period or antiquity:
 The kings of Cambodia claim descent from Queen Soma (1st century), although the historiographical record is interrupted in the "Post-Angkor Period" (15th/16th centuries). A real unified kingdom of Cambodia first came to existence in 802. The monarchy in Cambodia was abolished between 1970 and 1993.
 There exist several suggestions on a possible line of succession in the Danish monarchy from the late 7th century and until Gorm the Old, but none of these suggestions have so far won universal acceptance. Most monarchs in Denmark since the 940s have been descendants of Gorm the Old's father Harthacnut and all monarchs in Denmark since 1047 have been descendants of titular Queen Estrid Svendsdatter. A formal law of succession was not adopted in Denmark until 1665.
 Japan, considered a constitutional monarchy under the Imperial House of Japan, is traditionally said to have originated with the mythical Emperor Jimmu. The first verifiable historiographical evidence begins with Emperor Kinmei in the 6th century. It is the oldest continuous hereditary monarchy in the world.
 The monarchs of Norway by virtue of descent from Harald I Fairhair, who united the realm in 872. Harald as a member of the House of Yngling is given a partly legendary line of succession from earlier petty kings in historiographical tradition. Far from all monarchs of Norway since the 930s have been descendants of Harald Fairhair: at least seven or eight Norwegian kings from the period c. 970 – 1859 were not descendants of Harald Fairhair.
 The kings of Spain by descent from the Catholic Monarchs (via the House of Habsburg), ultimately combining the lines of succession of Castile and León and Aragon, realms established in the 10th to 11th centuries in the course of the Reconquista, via the Kingdom of Asturias claiming descent from the Visigothic Kingdom (which, originally ruled by the Thervingi kings, had become elective in the 6th century). The monarchy of Spain was abolished twice in the 19th and 20th centuries (1873–1874 and 1931–1947) and replaced by republics.
 The monarchs of the United Kingdom and Commonwealth realms inherit the throne by virtue of descent from Sophia of Hanover, according to the Act of Settlement 1701. Sophia was the granddaughter of James VI and I who inherited and held in union the kingdoms of England, Scotland and Ireland (Union of the Crowns) in 1603. Succession to the English throne originates with the House of Wessex, established in the 6th century; the Scottish throne with descent from Pictish kings who likewise enter the historical record around the 6th century.

Current monarchies

In Wallis and Futuna, an overseas territory of France in the South Pacific, there are three kingdoms, Uvea, Alo and Sigave, whose monarchs are chosen by local noble families.

See also

List of oldest institutions in continuous operation

Notes

References

Current
Monarchies, current
Monarchies, current